Peckoltia caenosa is a species of catfish in the family Loricariidae. It is native to South America, where it occurs in streams in the llanos of Venezuela that are part of the Orinoco drainage basin. The streams that it inhabits are typically slow-flowing and muddy, and the species is often seen hiding inside submerged hollow logs during the day. The species reaches 15.7 cm (6.2 inches) SL. Its specific epithet is derived from a Latin word meaning "muddy" or "dirty", referring both to the species' mottled coloration and the muddy habitats in which it is found.

This species sometimes appears in the aquarium trade, where it is usually referred to either as the mud pleco or by one of two L-numbers associated with it, which are LDA-020 and LDA-021.

References 

Ancistrini
Fish of South America